Don Valley North is a federal electoral district in Toronto, Ontario, Canada. It has been represented in the House of Commons of Canada from 1988 to 1997 and since 2015. Don Valley North covers the area of the City of Toronto bounded by  Steeles Avenue East to the north, Highway 401 to the south, Bayview Avenue to the west, and Victoria Park Avenue to the east. 

Former North York city council member Barbara Greene, a Progressive Conservative, was elected as its first Member of Parliament in the 1988 election. She was defeated by Liberal Sarkis Assadourian in the 1993 election.

This riding was originally created in 1987, and was first used in the federal election of 1988. It was created from parts of Don Valley East and York—Scarborough ridings. In 1996, the riding was abolished through redistribution, and divided between Don Valley East and Willowdale ridings. This riding was re-created from parts of Willowdale and Don Valley East during the 2012 electoral redistribution.

As per the 2016 Census, Don Valley North is one of the only three City of Toronto ridings where Chinese is both the most frequent ethnic origin (32.4% of the population) and most frequent ethnicity group (31.3%, while White/Europeans come second with 29.3% of the population).

Geography
This riding is located in the northeastern part of the North York district in Toronto. It contains the neighbourhoods of Henry Farm, Bayview Village, Bayview Woods-Steeles, Hillcrest Village, Don Valley Village, and Pleasant View.

Demographics 
According to the 2021 Canada Census

Ethnic groups: 29.2% Chinese, 25.1% White, 13.8% South Asian, 7.9% West Asian, 5.1% Black, 5.0% Filipino, 3.9% Korean, 2.5% Arab, 2.2% Latin American, 1.2% Southeast Asian

Languages: 31.2% English, 14.2% Mandarin, 8.6% Cantonese, 5.5% Persian, 3.2% Korean, 2.5% Tagalog, 2.2% Arabic, 2.0% Spanish, 1.4% Russian, 1.3% Hindi, 1.2% Romanian, 1.1% Tamil, 1.1% Armenian

Religions: 40.1% Christian (16.4% Catholic, 5.4% Christian Orthodox, 1.5% Anglican, 1.4% Presbyterian, 1.3% Baptist, 14.1% Other), 11.6% Muslim, 6.7% Hindu, 2.9% Jewish, 2.6% Buddhist, 34.2% None

Median income: $36,800 (2020)

Average income: $50,880 (2020)

Members of Parliament 

The riding has elected the following Members of Parliament:

Election results

2015–present

1988–1993

See also
 List of Canadian federal electoral districts
 Past Canadian electoral districts

References

External links
 Website of the Parliament of Canada

Former federal electoral districts of Ontario
Ontario federal electoral districts
Federal electoral districts of Toronto
North York
1987 establishments in Ontario
2012 establishments in Ontario
1996 disestablishments in Ontario